The Blythe Heat were a professional baseball team based in Blythe, California.  They played in the Arizona Winter League, a short-season instructional winter league affiliated with the North American League.  They began play in 2007 and played their home games at Alexander Field in Blythe.  They are the only team in the instructional league that play their home games somewhere other than the league's home base of Yuma, Arizona's Desert Sun Stadium.  They were owned by Diamond Sports & Entertainment.  The team's uniform logo was that of the former Western Baseball League team, the Chico Heat, predecessors to the GBL's Chico Outlaws.

They won the AWL Championship in their first season in March 2008.  They defeated the Canada Miners 10–5 in the Championship Game.  The franchise folded in 2011 after the NAL folded.

Season-by-season records
Arizona Winter League:

External links
 Arizona Winter League website
 North American League website
 Palo Verde/Quartzsite Times
 Guilin brothers in the minors (Palo Verde/Quartzsite Times)
 Slideshow: Blythe Heat - 2008 Winter League Champions Palo Verde/Quartzsite Times, August 5, 2008

Arizona Winter League teams
Blythe, California
Sports in Riverside County, California
Defunct baseball teams in California
Baseball teams disestablished in 2011
Baseball teams established in 2008